... & Nobody Else was released in 1999 and is a live album released by British rock band New Model Army.

The tracks on this album were recorded at a variety of venues during the Strange Brotherhood tour of 1998.

Track listing
Source: Official site, Allmusic, Discogs

All tracks written by Justin Sullivan and Robert Heaton except where noted.

Disc one

Disc two

Personnel
Justin Sullivan – vocals, guitar
Nelson – bass, guitar, drums
Michael Dean – drums, percussion
Dave Blomberg – guitar, bass
Dean White – keyboards

References

New Model Army (band) live albums
1999 live albums